All Saints Anglican Church  is an historic Carpenter Gothic   style Anglican church building located on 7th Street, East,  in Duck Lake, Saskatchewan, Canada. Built in 1896 of wood, its steep pitched roof, lancet windows and side entrance tower are typical of Gothic Revival churches. The church's historic burying ground contains the graves of many area pioneers.

The church is a municipal heritage site as designated by the town of Duck Lake on December 14, 1982.

References

Anglican church buildings in Saskatchewan
Carpenter Gothic church buildings in Saskatchewan
Heritage sites in Saskatchewan
19th-century Anglican church buildings in Canada